The 1950 Furman Purple Hurricane football team was an American football team that represented Furman University as a member of the Southern Conference (SoCon) during the 1950 college football season. Led by first-year head coach Bill Young, the Purple Hurricane compiled an overall record of 2–8–1 with a mark of 2–4 in conference play, placing 13th in the SoCon.

Schedule

References

Furman
Furman Paladins football seasons
Furman Purple Hurricane football